Ma Yunfeng (born October 17, 1983 in Harbin) is a Chinese male short track speed skater. He competed at the 2010 Winter Olympics in the 500m, 1000m, and 5000m relay events.

References

1983 births
Living people
Sportspeople from Harbin
Chinese male speed skaters
Chinese male short track speed skaters
Olympic short track speed skaters of China
Short track speed skaters at the 2010 Winter Olympics
Universiade medalists in short track speed skating
Universiade gold medalists for China
Competitors at the 2003 Winter Universiade
21st-century Chinese people